Henry John Dutton  (17 January 1847 — 1 January 1935) was an English cricketer and British Army officer.

The son of The Hon. John Thomas Dutton, he was born at Paddington in January 1847. He was educated at Eton College, after which he entered into the British Army by purchasing the rank of ensign in the Rifle Brigade in November 1866. Dutton later made a single appearance in first-class cricket for Hampshire against Kent at Winchester in 1875. From the lower order, he scored 0 not out in the first innings in which he batted, and 7 not out in the second innings. In June the following year, he retired from the Rifle Brigade with the rank of lieutenant. In later life, Dutton served as a justice of the peace for Hampshire. He died at Hinton Ampner House in Hampshire on New Year's Day in 1935. He was survived by his wife, Eleanor, with whom he had four children. Amongst them was Ralph Dutton, 8th Baron Sherborne.

References

External links

1847 births
1935 deaths
People from Paddington
People educated at Eton College
Rifle Brigade officers
English cricketers
Hampshire cricketers
English justices of the peace